The adversarial system or adversary system is a legal system used in the common law countries where two advocates represent their parties' case or position before an impartial person or group of people, usually a judge or jury, who attempt to determine the truth and pass judgment accordingly. It is in contrast to the inquisitorial system used in some civil law systems (i.e. those deriving from Roman law or the Napoleonic code) where a judge investigates the case.

The adversarial system is the two-sided structure under which criminal trial courts operate, putting the prosecution against the defense.

Basic features
Adversarial systems are considered to have three basic features. The first is a neutral decision-maker such as a judge or jury. The second is presentation of evidence in support of each party's case, usually by lawyers. The third is a highly
structured procedure.

The rules of evidence are developed based upon the system of objections of adversaries and on what basis it may tend to prejudice the trier of fact which may be the judge or the jury. In a way the rules of evidence can function to give a judge limited inquisitorial powers as the judge may exclude evidence he or she believes is not trustworthy, or irrelevant to the legal issue at hand. Peter Murphy in his Practical Guide to Evidence recounts an instructive example. A frustrated judge in an English (adversarial) court finally asked a barrister after witnesses had produced conflicting accounts, "Am I never to hear the truth?" "No, my lord, merely the evidence", replied counsel.

Parties
Judges in an adversarial system are impartial in ensuring the fair play of due process, or fundamental justice. Such judges decide, often when called upon by counsel rather than of their own motion, what evidence is to be admitted when there is a dispute; though in some common law jurisdictions judges play more of a role in deciding what evidence to admit into the record or reject. At worst, abusing judicial discretion would actually pave the way to a biased decision, rendering obsolete the judicial process in question—rule of law being illicitly subordinated by rule of man under such discriminating circumstances. Lord Devlin in The Judge said: "It can also be argued that two prejudiced searchers starting from opposite ends of the field will between them be less likely to miss anything than the impartial searcher starting at the middle."

The right to counsel in criminal trials was initially not accepted in some adversarial systems. It was believed that the facts should speak for themselves, and that lawyers would just blur the matters. As a consequence, it was only in 1836 that England gave suspects of felonies the formal right to have legal counsel (the Prisoners' Counsel Act 1836), although in practice, English courts routinely allowed defendants to be represented by counsel from the mid-18th century. During the second half of the 18th century, advocates like Sir William Garrow and Thomas Erskine, 1st Baron Erskine, helped usher in the adversarial court system used in most common law countries today. In the United States, however, personally retained counsel have had a right to appear in all federal criminal cases since the adoption of the United States Constitution, and in state cases at least since the end of the civil war, although nearly all provided this right in their state constitutions or laws much earlier. Appointment of counsel for indigent defendants was nearly universal in federal felony cases, though it varied considerably in state cases. It was not until 1963 that the U.S. Supreme Court declared that legal counsel must be provided at the expense of the state for indigent felony defendants, under the federal Sixth Amendment, in state courts. See Gideon v. Wainwright, .

Criminal proceedings

In criminal adversarial proceedings, an accused is not compelled to give evidence. Therefore, they may not be questioned by a prosecutor or judge unless they choose to be; however, should they decide to testify, they are subject to cross-examination and could be found guilty of perjury. As the election to maintain an accused person's right to silence prevents any examination or cross-examination of that person's position, it follows that the decision of counsel as to what evidence will be called is a crucial tactic in any case in the adversarial system and hence it might be said that it is a lawyer's manipulation of the truth. Certainly, it requires the skills of counsel on both sides to be fairly equally pitted and subjected to an impartial judge.

In some adversarial legislative systems, the court is permitted to make inferences on an accused's failure to face cross-examination or to answer a particular question. This obviously limits the usefulness of silence as a tactic by the defense. In the United States, the Fifth Amendment has been interpreted to prohibit a jury from drawing a negative inference based on the defendant's invocation of his or her right not to testify, and the jury must be so instructed if the defendant requests.

By contrast, while defendants in most civil law systems can be compelled to give statements, these statements are not subject to cross-examinations by the prosecution and are not given under oath. This allows the defendant to explain their side of the case without being subject to cross-examination by a skilled opposition. However, this is mainly because it is not the prosecutor but the judge who questions the defendant. The concept of "cross"-examination is entirely due to adversarial structure of the common law.

Comparison with inquisitorial systems

The name "adversarial system" may be misleading in that it implies it is only within this type of system in which there are opposing prosecution and defense. This is not the case, and both modern adversarial and inquisitorial systems have the powers of the state separated between a prosecutor and the judge and allow the defendant the right to counsel. Indeed, the European Convention on Human Rights and Fundamental Freedoms in Article 6 requires these features in the legal systems of its signatory states.

One of the most significant differences between the adversarial system and the inquisitorial system occurs when a criminal defendant admits to the crime. In an adversarial system, there is no more controversy and the case proceeds to sentencing; though in many jurisdictions the defendant must have allocution of her or his crime; an obviously false confession will not be accepted even in common law courts. By contrast, in an inquisitorial system, the fact that the defendant has confessed is merely one more fact that is entered into evidence, and a confession by the defendant does not remove the requirement that the prosecution present a full case. This allows for plea bargaining in adversarial systems in a way that is difficult or impossible in inquisitional system, and many felony cases in the United States are handled without trial through such plea bargains.

Comparisons with the inquisitorial approach

here are many differences in the way cases are reviewed. It is questionable that the results would be different if cases were conducted under the differing approaches; in fact no statistics exist that can show whether or not these systems would come to the same results. However, these approaches are often a matter of national pride and there are opinions amongst jurists about the merits of the differing approaches and their drawbacks as well.

Proponents of the adversarial system often argue that the system is more fair and less prone to abuse than the inquisitional approach, because it allows less room for the state to be biased against the defendant. It also allows most private litigants to settle their disputes in an amicable manner through discovery and pre-trial settlements in which non-contested facts are agreed upon and not dealt with during the trial process.

The discovery process can be abused as one party will not provide the evidence as for by the opposing party.

In addition, adversarial procedure defenders argue that the inquisitorial court systems are overly institutionalized and removed from the average citizen. The common law trial lawyer has ample opportunity to uncover the truth in the courtroom. Most cases that go to trial are carefully prepared through a discovery process that aids in the review of evidence and testimony before it is presented to judge or jury. The lawyers involved have a very good idea of the scope of agreement and disagreement of the issues to present at trial which develops much in the same way as the role of investigative judges.

Proponents of inquisitorial justice dispute these points. They point out that many cases in adversarial systems, and most cases in the United States, are actually resolved by plea bargain or settlement. Plea bargain as a system does not exist in an inquisitorial system. Many legal cases in adversarial systems, and most in the United States, do not go to trial, which may lead to injustice when the defendant has an unskilled or overworked attorney, which is likely to be the case when the defendant is poor. In addition, proponents of inquisitorial systems argue that the plea bargain system causes the participants in the system to act in perverse ways, in that it encourages prosecutors to bring charges far in excess of what is warranted and defendants to plead guilty even when they believe that they are not.

See also

 Adversary evaluation
 Exclusionary rule
 Parallel thinkingdescribed as a systemic alternative

References

Further reading

Judiciaries
Legal systems